A I A: Alien Observer is the seventh studio album by American musician Liz Harris under the stage name Grouper. It is the second of her two-part album series A I A, released on April 11, 2011, on Yellow Electric. The track "Alien Observer" was issued on April 3, prior to the album's release.

Critical reception

A I A: Alien Observer, along with A I A: Dream Loss, received an honorable mention on Pitchforks list of the best albums of 2011. In 2016, Pitchfork ranked Alien Observer at number 21 on its list of the 50 best ambient albums of all time.

Track listing

References

2011 albums
Grouper (musician) albums